Alopecocyon was a small relative of the modern red panda. It weighed only about 11 lb (5 kg). It was closely related to Simocyon, a larger member of its group. Its fossils have been found in France, Poland, and Slovakia.

References 

Prehistoric mammals of Europe
Prehistoric carnivoran genera
Ailuridae
Fossil taxa described in 1940
Miocene musteloids